Volsky District is an administrative and municipal district (raion), one of the thirty-eight in Saratov Oblast, Russia. It is located in the north of the oblast. Its administrative center is the town of Volsk (which is not administratively a part of the district). Population: 27,457 (2010 Census);

Administrative and municipal status
Within the framework of administrative divisions, Volsky District is one of the thirty-eight in the oblast. The town of Volsk serves as its administrative center, despite being incorporated separately as a town under oblast jurisdiction—an administrative unit with the status equal to that of the districts (and which, in addition to Khvalynsk, also includes one urban-type settlement and three rural localities).

As a municipal division, the district is incorporated as Volsky Municipal District, with Volsk Town Under Oblast Jurisdiction being incorporated within it as Volsk Urban Settlement.

References

Notes

Sources

Districts of Saratov Oblast

